Charles Lee may refer to:

Politics
Charles Lee (Attorney General) (1758–1815), lawyer and United States Attorney General
Charles Lee (Australian politician) (1842–1926), Minister for Justice, 1898–1899, and Secretary for Public Works, 1899
Charles Lee (Hong Kong politician) (born 1936), former chairman of Hong Kong Exchanges and Clearing Limited
Charles Lee (activist) (active in 1987), American environmental justice activist

Sports 
Charlie Lee (Australian footballer) (1896–1979), Australian rules footballer
Charles Lee (cricketer) (1924–1999), English first-class cricketer
Charles A. Lee (born 1977), American sprinting athlete
Charles Lee (American football) (born 1977), former American football wide receiver
Charles Lee (basketball) (born 1984), American basketball player
Charlie Lee (English footballer) (born 1987), English football player
Charlie Lee (squash player) (born 1998), English squash player
Charlie Lee (football coach) (born 1945), American football coach

Others 
Charles Lee (general) (1732–1782), Anglo-American soldier of the American Revolutionary War
Charles Lee (British architect) (1803–1880/4–1880), in partnership with Thomas Talbot Bury, 1845–1849
S. Charles Lee (1899–1990), American architect of U.S movie palaces
Charles Lee (author) (1870–1956), British author
Charles Goodall Lee (1881–1973), first licensed Chinese American dentist in California
Charles Freeman Lee (1927–1997), American jazz trumpeter
Charles Lee (active 2004–2006), guitarist of the band Loser
Charles Lee (scientist) (born 1969), Canadian pathology scientist
Charles E. Lee (1917–2008), American archivist and historian in South Carolina
Charlie Lee (computer scientist), creator of Litecoin
J. Charles Lee, president of Mississippi State University

See also 
Charles Lea (disambiguation)
Charles Lees (disambiguation)
Charles Leigh (disambiguation)
Charles Vaughan-Lee (1867–1928), senior Royal Navy officer